Louis Friedrich Wurm (1832 – 1 December 1910), generally known as Fred or Frederick was an early colonist of South Australia.

History
Wurm was born at Dortmund (then in Prussia), in 1832. He emigrated to South Australia aboard not found in 1849.
The following year he joined the Mounted Police, and was for some years stationed at Angaston. 
In 1856 he joined his brother Friedrich Carl Wilhelm Heinrich "Henry" Wurm in business in Grenfell Street, but when Henry left for New Zealand in 1860 Frederick went into business as a grain and produce merchant in Twin Street.
In 1873 he entered into partnership with C. N. Collins with a general store in Stansbury, with branches at Curramulka and Minlaton.

Other interests
He turned his property in Unley Park into a very productive garden, and exhibited dried fruits, olive oil and silk  in London, Paris, and Philadelphia, winning various medals and diplomas. He was awarded a £250 bonus as the first to produce   of silk produced in South Australia in one year. 
He was a fine tenor, and a member of the Adelaide Liedertafel and conductor of the Unley Glee Club.
For nine years he was organist at St. Augustine's Church, Unley

Family
Wurm married Julia Crush ( –1912) in  1859. Their family included:
Elizabeth Julia Wurm  (1860–1948) married Richard Curtis Yeo ( –1903) in 1881, lived in Unley
Frederick Henry Wurm (1865–1938) of Port Pirie acted as Consul for Norway, was awarded the title of Chevalier of the Order of St. Olav in recognition of his services.
Gertrude Mary Wurm (1867–1939) married Henry Mayelston Mudie (28 March 1857 – 20 February 1933) in 1903, lived in Hawthorn
Gustav Adolph Wurm (1869–1943) of Stansbury
Walter Charles Wurm, from 1916 known as Walter Charles Weston, (1872– ) formerly of Port Pirie, later of the Port Adelaide Customs Department
Alfred Ernest Wurm, from 1917 known as Alfred Ernest Weston, (1877–1939) storekeeper, of Eastern Well
Mabel Josephine Wurm (1883–1918) of Stansbury, buried at Mitcham Anglican Cemetery

References 

1832 births
1910 deaths
Australian classical organists
Male classical organists
Australian farmers